Aguascalientia panamaensis is an extinct species of miniature camels found in Panama first described by Aldo F. Rincon et al. in 2012.

Taxonomy

Aguascalientia was named by Rincon et al. (2012).

References

Prehistoric camelids
Miocene even-toed ungulates
Miocene mammals of North America
Ungulates of Central America